"The Gypsy in My Soul" is a popular song written for the 50th anniversary of the University of Pennsylvania Mask and Wig show in 1937 by two Penn graduates, Clay Boland and Moe Jaffe. Boland wrote the music and Jaffe the lyrics. Although both men had long since graduated, it had become the practice at the time for professionals, rather than students, to compose songs for the show.

Although the song did not become a big hit at the time it was written, it has become a classic over the decades, particularly in the jazz repertoire, as it has been recorded by over 100 artists.

Recorded versions

 Louis Armstrong
 Mildred Bailey with Red Norvo's Orchestra recorded on December 19, 1945 and released on Crown 104
 Shirley Bassey - The Bewitching Miss Bassey (1959)
 Charlie Byrd - instrumental
 June Christy
 Rosemary Clooney - At Long Last (with the Count Basie Orchestra) (1998)
 Perry Como - for his album Saturday Night with Mr. C (1958)
 Bing Crosby recorded the song in 1955 for use on his radio show and it was subsequently included in the box set The Bing Crosby CBS Radio Recordings (1954-56) issued by Mosaic Records (catalog MD7-245) in 2009. 
 Johnny Dankworth - Too Cool for the Blues (2010)
 Sammy Davis Jr. with orchestra conducted by Jack Pleis recorded on August 3, 1956 and released on Decca's Sammy Swings (1957)
 Doris Day with orchestra conducted by Paul Weston recorded in 1956 and released on the Columbia album Day by Day
 Connie Evingson
 Ella Fitzgerald on her Verve release Get Happy!
 Eydie Gorme
Al Hirt on his album, Live at Carnegie Hall (1965)
 Jay and the Americans
 Shirley MacLaine - Live at the Palace
 Melissa Manchester
 Marian McPartland
 Liza Minnelli
 Anita O'Day - An Evening with Anita O'Day (1956)
 Patti Page
 Oscar Peterson - instrumental
 André Previn - instrumental
 Bud Shank and Bob Cooper - instrumental
 Jeri Southern The Dream's on Jeri (1998)
 Jo Stafford with the Art Van Damme Trio recorded on September 30, 1956 and released on the Columbia album Once Over Lightly
 Bobby Troup
 Margaret Whiting with Frank DeVol's Orchestra recorded December 23, 1947 and released on Capitol 15038
 Joe Williams
 Lester Young, Roy Eldridge & "Sweets" Edison - instrumental

References

1934 songs
Songs written by Moe Jaffe
Songs written by Clay Boland
Louis Armstrong songs
Mildred Bailey songs
Shirley Bassey songs
Rosemary Clooney songs
Bing Crosby songs
Sammy Davis Jr. songs
Doris Day songs
Jay and the Americans songs
Patti Page songs